Paul Eugene Dudley (born January 16, 1939 in Fort Smith, Arkansas) is a former American football defensive back and running back in the National Football League for the New York Giants and the Philadelphia Eagles.  He played college football at the University of Arkansas and was drafted in the fourth round of the 1961 NFL Draft by the Green Bay Packers.  Dudley was also selected in the 29th round of the 1962 AFL Draft by the San Diego Chargers. He later player in the Canadian Football League.

1939 births
1987 deaths
Sportspeople from Fort Smith, Arkansas
Players of American football from Arkansas
American football defensive backs
American football running backs
Arkansas Razorbacks football players
New York Giants players
Philadelphia Eagles players
Calgary Stampeders players
Saskatchewan Roughriders players